Jane Wilson (1924–2015) was an American painter.

Jane Wilson may also refer to:
 Jane Delaplaine Wilson (1830–1915), author
 Jane Bartle-Wilson (born 1951), English equestrian 
 Jane Wilson-Howarth (born 1954), British author
 Jane and Louise Wilson (born 1967), British artists, working together as a sibling duo 
 Jane Wilson (died 1844), wife of Spencer Perceval
 Jane Wilson, a character in Mary Barton (1848), a novel by Elizabeth Gaskell

See also
 Jane Wynne Willson (born 1933), British humanist